Amprolium is the organic compound sold as a coccidiostat used in poultry.  It has many International Nonproprietary Names.


Uses in coccidiosis treatment in poultry
The drug is a thiamine analogue and blocks the thiamine transporter of Eimeria species. By blocking thiamine uptake it prevents carbohydrate synthesis.

Despite only moderate efficacy it is well favoured due to few resistance issues and is commonly used in the United States in conjunction with sulfonamides prophylactically in chickens and cattle as a coccidiostat.

Synthesis

Condensation of ethoxymethylenemalononitrile (1) with acetamidine (2) affords the substituted pyrimidine (4). The reaction may well involve conjugate addition of the amidine nitrogen to the malononitrile followed by loss of ethoxide (3); addition of the remaining amidine nitrogen to one of the nitriles will then lead to the pyrimidine (4). Reduction of the nitrile gives the corresponding aminomethyl compound (5). Exhaustive methylation of the amine followed by displacement of the activated quaternary nitrogen by bromide ion affords the key intermediate (7). Displacement of the halogen by α-picoline gives amprolium.

References

Antiprotozoal agents
Pyridines
Pyrimidines
Chlorides